Sergeant John Moyney  (8 January 1895 – 10 November 1980) was an Irish recipient of the Victoria Cross, the highest and most prestigious award for gallantry in the face of the enemy that can be awarded to British and Commonwealth forces.

Military career
John Moyney was born in Rathdowney, [[County Laois Ireland.  He was 22 years old, and a lance-sergeant in the 2nd Battalion, Irish Guards, British Army during the First World War when the following deed took place for which he was awarded the VC.

On 12/13 September 1917 north of Broenbeek, Belgium, Lance-Sergeant Moyney was in command of 15 men forming two advanced posts. Surrounded by the enemy he held his post for 96 hours, having no water and very little food. On the fifth day, on the enemy advancing to dislodge him, he attacked them with bombs, while also using his Lewis gun with great effect. Finding himself surrounded, he led his men in a charge through the enemy and reached a stream, where he and a private (Thomas Woodcock) covered his party while they crossed unscathed, before crossing themselves under a shower of bullets.

Moyney later achieved the rank of sergeant. He died in Roscrea, County Tipperary on 10 November 1980.  His Victoria Cross is displayed at the Guards Regimental Headquarters (Irish Guards RHQ), Wellington Barracks, London.

On 12 September 2017 a memorial was unveiled on Mill Road, Rathdowney.

References

Listed in order of publication year 
The Register of the Victoria Cross (1981, 1988 and 1997)

Ireland's VCs  (Dept of Economic Development, 1995)
Monuments to Courage (David Harvey, 1999)
Irish Winners of the Victoria Cross (Richard Doherty & David Truesdale, 2000)

External links
Location of grave and VC medal (County Tipperary, Ireland)
Jack Moyney VC – Roscrea Through the Ages(County Tipperary, Ireland)

1895 births
1980 deaths
Military personnel from County Laois
Irish World War I recipients of the Victoria Cross
Irish Guards soldiers
British Army personnel of World War I
People from County Laois
Irish soldiers in the British Army
British Army recipients of the Victoria Cross